Richard D. Dunphy (December 12, 1841 – November 23, 1904) was a Union Navy sailor in the American Civil War and a recipient of the U.S. military's highest decoration, the Medal of Honor, for his actions at the Battle of Mobile Bay.

Military service
Born on December 12, 1841, in Ireland, Dunphy immigrated to the United States and was living in New York City when he joined the U.S. Navy on December 17, 1863. At the Battle of Mobile Bay on August 5, 1864, he "performed his duties with skill and courage" despite heavy fire. He was severely wounded by fragments of an artillery shell fired by the Confederate ironclad , losing both of his arms above the elbow. For his actions during the battle, he was approved for the Medal of Honor four months later, on December 31, 1864.

Medal of Honor citation

Rank and organization: Coal Heaver, U.S. Navy. Accredited to: New York.

Dunphy's official Medal of Honor citation reads:
On board the flagship U.S.S. Hartford during successful attacks against Fort Morgan, rebel gunboats and the rebel ram Tennessee, Mobile Bay, 5 August 1864. With his ship under terrific enemy shellfire, Dunphy performed his duties with skill and courage throughout this fierce engagement which resulted in the capture of the rebel ram Tennessee.

Post War life, death and burial
After his injury, Dunphy left the Navy and hired an aide to accompany him throughout the day and assist with such tasks as feeding himself. In 1866, he wrote a letter to Secretary of the Navy Gideon Welles explaining that he had never received his medal. He eventually moved to Wisconsin, married, and raised a family. The Wisconsin Legislature approved an extra pension for Dunphy in 1868 to help him support his family. Dunphy died on November 23, 1904, in San Francisco, California at age 62 and was buried in Saint Vincent's Cemetery, Vallejo, California.

Dunphy's obituary in the November 24, 1904 San Francisco Call newspaper read:

Old Naval Hero Dies. - Richard D. Dunphy, one of the naval heroes of the Civil War, passed away at his home in this city yesterday morning. Dunphy served in Admiral Farragut's fleet during the war and had both arms shot off during the battle of Mobile Bay. He was a native of Ireland and 62 years old.

References

External links 
 Photograph of Dunphy at Luminous Lint
 

1841 births
1904 deaths
Irish emigrants to the United States (before 1923)
People of New York (state) in the American Civil War
Union Navy sailors
United States Navy Medal of Honor recipients
Irish-born Medal of Honor recipients
People without hands
American amputees
American Civil War recipients of the Medal of Honor